Caulerpa agardhii is a species of seaweed in the Caulerpaceae family.

It is found along the coast in a small area in the Kimberley region of Western Australia.

References

agardhii
Species described in 1898